The Tosa Nikki (Tosa Diary 土佐日記) is a poetic diary written anonymously by the tenth-century Japanese poet Ki no Tsurayuki. The text details a 55-day journey in 935 returning to Kyoto from Tosa province, where Tsurayuki had been the provincial governor.  The prose account of the journey is punctuated by Japanese poems, purported to have been composed on the spot by the characters.

Diary Prose 
The Tosa Nikki is the first notable example of the Japanese diary as literature. Until its time, the word “diary” (nikki) denoted dry official records of government or family affairs, written by men in Sino-Japanese.  By contrast, the Tosa Diary is written in the Japanese language, using phonetic kana characters.  Literate men of the period wrote in both kana and kanji, but women typically were not taught the latter, being restricted to kana literature. By framing the diary in the point of view of a fictitious female narrator, Tsurayuki could avoid employing Chinese characters or citing Chinese poems, focusing instead on the aesthetics of the Japanese language and its poetry.

Travel poetry 
The Tosa Nikki is associated with travel poems (kiryoka) (such as those compiled in the Man'yōshū) as well as the utamakura and utanikki. These texts constitute the Japanese travel journal, which - as a literary genre - is considered inseparable from poetry. These follow the tradition of weaving of poems and the use of introductory narratives written in a logical structure. Like other poems in the genre, the Tosa Nikki also explored the significance of landscape as well poems written about it. Even the Tosa Nikki was also alluded to by other poems such as the maeku.

The "Tosa Nikki" also implements fictional names of places to call on earlier and traditional Japanese texts. The usage of fictional names also allows a merge between fictional and autobiographical genres. By incorporating fictional elements with real scenery in both narration and poems, Tosa Nikki allows allusions to previous works and conveys different images and significance to those already popular locations.

Locations in Tosa Nikki
Below are the dates and locations the narrator travelled to. The dates are written according to the lunar calendar.

Themes

Grief 
The loss of a child and a grieving parent are frequently mentioned by the narrator and the many that accompany the journey. For example, on the 27th of the 12th month, it referenced "a parent [who] was lost in grief for an absent child" with the poem accompanying the day also written about "one among us who will not be going home". This suggests that the child had passed recently or during the journey. Another example can be found on the 5th day of the 2nd month, as the grieving mother composes her own poem and expresses her pain and unwillingness to forget about her child. An interpretation can be that the child is still among the group spiritually, and the mother's grief is the emotional attachment keeping the child from moving on.

It is speculated that Ki no Tsurayuki has lost a child during this time, and alluded to his and his family's grief through various characters the narrator encounters.

References

External links
 

Fiction set in the 10th century
10th-century Japanese books
10th-century poems
Diaries
Heian period in literature
Japanese poems
Late Old Japanese texts
Travel books
935
10th century in Japan
Ki no Tsurayuki
Diaries of the Heian period